Boisdinghem is a commune in the Pas-de-Calais department in the Hauts-de-France region in northern France.

Geography
A small village situated 5 miles (8 km) west of Saint-Omer, on theD206 road.

Population

Sights
 The church of St. Omer, dating from the seventeenth century

Notable residents
 Alphonse Pinart (1852-1911), explorer, philologist, and ethnographer

See also
Communes of the Pas-de-Calais department

References

Communes of Pas-de-Calais